Syed Talat Hussain (Urdu, ; born May 5, 1966) is a Pakistani journalist and YouTuber who hosted a prime time current affairs talk show on Geo News titled Naya Pakistan with Talat Hussain. Syed Talat Hussain is brother of Rifaat Hussainn a Pakistani political scientist, professor, defense analyst and television personality whose career in the academia spans over four decades.

Early career 
After the start of PTV World TV channel, he started a program called News Night.
Before that, he had been an executive director of AAJ TV and had also worked for Dawn News TV channel. He has written for Newsline magazine, Daily Dawn newspaper, Time magazine, Daily Times (Pakistan) newspaper, Daily Express newspaper and occasionally contributed to India Today newspaper and writing columns for The Daily Express newspaper.

He has held key positions of director, News & Current Affairs with Pakistan Television Corporation, Prime Television (UK) and Telebiz. Talat was director of news at Aaj TV and also writes occasionally for Daily Express, an Urdu newspaper, since July 2008.

In April 2018, Hussain said in a tweet that the day Geo was unable to "allow space for balanced journalism" there would be "no reason for me to continue to appear on their platform." His tweet came after Geo TV, part of Pakistan's largest commercial media group, Jang Group of Newspapers, was taken off the air in many parts of the country. The ban only ended a month later after talks between the military and the network's chiefs, who pledged to change the network's coverage. Army Chief General Qamar Javed Bajwa held a briefing with a group of journalists in which he described Geo TV as "subversive" and warned the channel that it would face consequences for crossing "red lines" by challenging the military.

In 2022, Syed Talat Hussain who had been a vocal critic of the previous PTI government and Imran Khan faced many problems during the PTI ruling period. He was taken off air by Geo News among many other things to cause him problems due to his reporting.

Personal life
Talat Hussain was born into a Syeds family in Chakwal District. Talat Hussain went to Sadiq Public School, Bahawalpur and later did his master's degree from Quaid-e-Azam University in Islamabad. He is married to his first cousin, Tehmina Hussain. They have three children together.His son,Shamyl Hussain plays u19 cricket and is really successful in his cricketing career.He has played the first edition of Pakistan Junior League as the captain of Gwadar Sharks and has represented Pakistan under-19 .He is currently completing his A levels from Beaconhouse Margalla Campus, Islamabad.

Current affairs TV shows by Talat Hussain 
 Sawaray Sawaray - PTV
 News Night - PTV
 Live with Talat - AAJ TV (First Show: 23 March 2005, Last Show: 29 Oct 2010)
 News Night With Talat– Dawn News (First Show: 8 November 2010)
 Live with Talat - Express News (TV channel) (June, 2012 to August 2013)
 Live with Talat - AAJ TV ( January 2014 to May 2014)
 Naya Pakistan with Talat Hussain - Geo News ( February 2015 to November 2018 )

See also 
 Daily Times (Pakistan)
 List of Pakistani journalists
 Nadeem Malik (Pakistani journalist)
 Faisal Qureshi

References

External links

Living people
Punjabi people
Pakistani male journalists
Pakistan Television Corporation executives
People from Rawalpindi District
Pakistani YouTubers
Quaid-i-Azam University alumni
1966 births